Lokalbanen A/S (The Local Railway, abbreviated LB) was a Danish railway company responsible for train operation and related passenger services on five local railways north of Copenhagen, Denmark. The company was formed in 2001, and merged with Regionstog A/S in 2015 to form the railway company Lokaltog A/S.

History
Owned by the Greater Copenhagen Authority (HUR), Lokalbanen was established in 2001 following HUR's acquisition of the share of the railway lines previously owned by the Danish state. The company headquarters were located in Hillerød; the company also had offices in various stations on the lines it operates.

Lokalbanen operated on the lines formerly controlled by Frederiksværkbanen (HFHJ), Gribskovbanen (GDS), Hornbækbanen (HHGB), Nærumbanen (LNJ) and Østbanen (ØSJS), from which it took over operation in May 2002. All companies were subsequently closed. Ownership of the trains and infrastructure from the companies is now the responsibility of Hovedstadens Lokalbaner (HL), from which Lokalbanen leased its trains; all HL lines were run by LB.

Railway lines

Rolling stock

See also
 Rail transport in Denmark
 Hovedstadens Lokalbaner

External links
 
 company website (danish language)

2001 establishments in Denmark
2015 disestablishments in Denmark
Companies based in Hillerød Municipality
Defunct railway companies of Denmark
Hovedstadens Lokalbaner
Railway companies established in 2001
Railway companies disestablished in 2015